Hiroshima Plant is an automobile manufacturing complex in Aki, Minami, Hiroshima, Japan, operated by Mazda Motor Corporation.  The complex consists of two main elements, the head office in Aki District, and the main plant in nearby Ujina District.  It was Mazda's only car-assembly plant in Japan until the Hofu Plant opened in 1982. Mazda's own museum is situated within the plant, showcasing some of Mazda's historic cars and their present and future models.

Head office
The head office opened March 1931 and continues to serve as a site for piston engine and transmission production.

Plant complex
The plant complex includes Plants I and II (officially "U1" and "U2" for their Ujina location).

Ujina 1 opened in November 1966.

Ujina 2's engine plant opened in December 1964, with the current automobile assembly plant opening in December 1972.

Current vehicles

Ujina 1
Mazda Roadster/MX-5/Miata (1989–present)
Mazda CX-9 (export) (2006–present)
Mazda CX-5 (2012–present)
Mazda CX-3 (2016–present)
Fiat 124 Spider (2016–present)
Abarth 124 Spider (2017–present)
Mazda CX-30 (2019–present)

Ujina 2
Mazda CX-5 (2012–present)
Mazda CX-8 (2017–present)

Past vehicles 
Mazdago (1931)
Mazda K360 (1959–1969)
Mazda R360 (1960–1966)
Mazda Porter (1961–1968)
Mazda B-Series (1961–2006)
Mazda Carol/P360 (1962–1964)
Mazda Familia/GLC/323 (1963–1982)
Mazda Luce/929 (1966–1990)
Mazda Bongo/E-Series (1966–2018)
Mazda Capella/626/Montrose (1970–1982)
Mazda Titan (1971–2000)
Mazda Parkway (1972-1997)
Mazda Chantez (1972–1976)
Mazda RX-7 (1978–2002)
Mazda MPV/Mazda8 (1989–2016)
Mazda Sentia/929 (1991–1998)
Mazda Demio/Mazda2 (1996–2014)
Mazda Premacy/Mazda5 (1999–2017)
Mazda RX-8 (2003–2012)
Mazda CX-7 (2006–2012)
Mazda Biante (2008–2017)

References

External links
Mazda: Activities in Japan
  

Mazda factories
Motor vehicle assembly plants in Japan
Buildings and structures in Hiroshima Prefecture